John D'Amico may refer to:

 John D'Amico (ice hockey), ice hockey player and supervisor of officials
 John C. D'Amico, American politician from Illinois
 John D'Amico Jr., American politician from New Jersey
 Jackie D'Amico, New York mobster